Sobolewski (feminine Sobolewska) is a Polish locational surname, which means a person from places in Poland called Sobolew or Sobolewo, both derived from the Polish sobol, meaning "sable".

Notable people with this surname include:

 Andrzej Sobolewski (born 1951), Polish physicist and academic 
 Johann Friedrich Eduard Sobolewsk (1808-1872), Polish-American violinist
 Ludwik Leszek Sobolewski (born 1965), Polish lawyer and the CEO of the Bucharest Stock Exchange
 Michael Anthony Sobolewski (born 1954), American bassist and backing vocalist for Van Halen and the rock supergroups Chickenfoot and the Circle
 Paweł Sobolewski (born 1979), Polish footballer who played as midfielder
 Radosław Sobolewski (born 1976), Polish former football player
 Sigmund Sobolewski (1923–2017), Polish Catholic Holocaust survivor and activist

See also
Sobolevsky (disambiguation)
Sobolew (disambiguation)
Sobolewo (disambiguation)

References 

Polish-language surnames
Polish toponymic surnames